Play is the first album by Masaki Suda. It was released on March 21, 2018. The single "Sayonara Elegy" was used as the theme song of Todome no Kiss. The album debuted at number two on the Oricon Albums Chart.

Track listing
CD version

There are two addition songs, Baka ni natchatta no ka na (ばかになっちゃったのかな) and Amegaagarukoroni (雨が上がる頃に) in digital version.

Charts

Album

Singles
Billboard Japan Year-end 2018 Hot 100

Oricon Karaoke Chart Yearly 2019

References

2018 debut albums
Japanese-language albums
Masaki Suda albums